"Let It Roll" is a song recorded by the Canadian country music groups Emerson Drive and Doc Walker. It was released in October 2012 as the second single from Emerson Drive's seventh studio album, Roll. It peaked at number 61 on the Canadian Hot 100 in February 2013.

Music video
The music video was directed by David Pichette and was premiered in November 2012.

Chart performance
"Let It Roll" debuted at number 91 on the Canadian Hot 100 for the week of January 26, 2013.

References

2012 singles
2012 songs
Emerson Drive songs
Doc Walker songs
Open Road Recordings singles
Songs written by Danick Dupelle
Vocal collaborations